Pablo Andrés Godoy (born 30 April 1984) is a Paraguayan football manager and former player.

Career
Godoy joined Bolivian side Always Ready in 2015, initially as manager of the youth and reserve sides. In September 2019, he was an interim manager of the first team after the departure of Julio César Baldivieso, but his reign only lasted one day as the club hired Sebastián Núñez. He was also an interim manager of the main squad previously on two occasions, both in the Copa Simón Bolívar.

In December 2019, after Núñez left and the club hired Eduardo Villegas for the 2020 season, Godoy was an interim manager for the last two matches of the campaign. He subsequently returned to his previous role, but was named permanent first team manager on 29 July 2021, in the place of sacked Omar Asad.

Demoted to the reserve squad of Always Ready on 29 January 2022, Godoy was appointed in charge of fellow top tier side Universitario de Vinto on 15 August. On 27 December, he resigned from the latter club just weeks after agreeing to a new deal, and returned to Always Ready the following day.

On 6 March 2023, after the club's elimination in the 2023 Copa Libertadores, Godoy was sacked.

References

External links

1984 births
Living people
Sportspeople from Asunción
Paraguayan footballers
Club Real Potosí players
Universitario de Sucre footballers
Paraguayan expatriate footballers
Paraguayan expatriate sportspeople in Bolivia
Expatriate footballers in Bolivia
Paraguayan football managers
Bolivian Primera División managers
Club Always Ready managers
Paraguayan expatriate football managers
Expatriate football managers in Bolivia
Association footballers not categorized by position
F.C. Universitario de Vinto managers